Gamal Abdel Nasser, the 2nd president of Egypt, died on 28 September 1970, at age 52. Abdel Nasser, one of the most respected and revered Arab leaders, died suddenly after bidding farewell to the Emir of Kuwait at the airport, as soon as the work of the emergency Arab summit ended. Vice president Anwar Sadat gave a speech to the nation announcing the death of Nasser. After the news of his death came out, Egyptian television and radio hastily began reciting the verses of the Qur'an. Nasser never recovered from the consequences of the 1967 defeat.

He was succeeded by his vice president, Anwar Sadat. His funeral was attended by millions of Egyptians and foreign mourners, including leaders. At least 46 people were killed and 80 injured in the crush. The United Arab Republic declared 40 days of mourning, India three days, and Algeria at least three days. Cuba, East Germany and Yugoslavia also declared one day of mourning each.

Illness and death 
Nasser was a heavy smoker and had a family history of heart attacks. He was also suffering from diabetes. He had a heart attack in 1966 and September 1969.

Abdel Nasser was mediating between the King of Jordan and the leader of the Liberation Organization to stop their civil war.

Funeral service 

The funeral was attended by all Arab leaders, with the exception of the aging Saudi monarch. Even in Arab countries, people came out to express their grief. In Jerusalem, about 75,000 Palestinians marched, chanting "Nasser will never die".

Dignitaries 
States
: Spiro Koleka (Envoy)
: Houari Boumedienne (President)
: Emir Isa bin Salman Al Khalifa
: Paul Martin (Envoy)
: Jean-Bédel Bokassa (President)
: Sirimavo Bandaranaike (Prime Minister)
: Guo Moruo (Envoy)
: Archbishop Makarios (President)
: Paul Verner (Envoy)
: Emperor Haile Selassie I 
: Jacques Chaban-Delmas (Prime Minister)
: Stylianos Pattakos (Deputy Premier)
: Gopal Swarup Pathak (Vice President)
: Amir-Abbas Hoveyda (Prime Minister)
: Hardan al-Tikriti (Vice President)
: Aldo Moro (Foreign Minister)
: Kiichi Aichi (Foreign Minister)
: King Hussein
: Emir Sabah Al-Salim Al-Sabah
: Suleiman Frangieh (President)
: Colonel Muammar Gaddafi
: Mohamed Ghazali Jawi (Minister of Agriculture)
: Ahmed Balafrej (Envoy)
: Kang Ryang Uk (Envoy)
: Abdul Rahman al-Eryani (President)
: Abdul Motaleb Malik (Minister of Health)
: Prince Fahd bin Abdulaziz Al Saud
: Mohamed Siad Barre (President)
: Salim Rubai Ali (President)
: Alexei Kosygin (Premier)
: Gregorio López-Bravo (Foreign Minister)
: Jaafar Nimeiry (President)
: Nureddin al-Atassi (President)
: Julius Nyerere (President)
: Habib Bourguiba Jr. (Minister of Justice)
: Süleyman Demirel (Foreign Minister)
: Alec Douglas-Home (Foreign Secretary)
: Elliot L. Richardson (Secretary of Health)
: Edvard Kardelj (Envoy)

Organizations
 GRUNK: Penn Nouth (Envoy)
: Yasser Arafat (Chairman)
 SWAPO: Sam Nujoma (President)

Suspicions 
Doubts arose about the cause of death, including that he was poisoned, but these allegations were not supported by evidence.

References 

Burials in Egypt
Gamal Abdel Nasser
Death of men
September 1970 events in Africa
1970 in Egypt